Terry L. Murphy is a Republican member of Montana Legislature.  He was elected for Senate District 39, representing the Cardwell, Montana area.  He previously served the House of Representative in 1971.

References

External links
 Home page

Living people
Year of birth missing (living people)
Republican Party Montana state senators
People from Jefferson County, Montana
Republican Party members of the Montana House of Representatives